Freedom Bondage is an album by Zeni Geva released in August 1995 via Alternative Tentacles.

Track listing
"Alienation" – 1:34
"Alienation pt. 2" – 1:11
"Death Blows" – 3:23
"Burn Your Flesh Out" – 3:47
"Disorganization" – 3:14
"Hate Trader/Interzona" – 6:02
"Shi No Umi (Sea of Death)" – 4:07
"Freedom Bondage" – 4:19
"Ground Zero" – 10:58

Personnel
Kazuyuki K. Null – vocals, electric guitar, keyboards, percussion
Mitsuru Tabata – acoustic guitar, electric guitars
Eito Noro – drums, percussion

References

1995 albums
Zeni Geva albums
Albums produced by Steve Albini
Alternative Tentacles albums